Drive-In is a 1976 American comedy film directed by Rod Amateau and written by Bob Peete. The film stars Lisa Lemole, Gary Lee Cavagnaro, Glenn Morshower, Billy Milliken, Lee Newsom and Regan Kee. The film was released on May 26, 1976, by Columbia Pictures.

Plot
"Disaster '76", the latest disaster film, is playing at The Alamo, a drive-in theater in a small Texas town. The night brings together a young couple, two rival youth gangs, a pair of thieves planning to rob the drive-in, a nervous doctor and a host of other characters.

Cast
Lisa Lemole as Glowie Hudson
Gary Lee Cavagnaro as Little Bit
Glenn Morshower as Orville Hennigson
Billy Milliken as Enoch
Lee Newsom  as Widow Maker
Regan Kee as Spoon
Andy Parks as Widow Maker
Trey Wilson as Gifford
Gordon Hurst as Will Henry
Kent Perkins as Bill Hill
Ashley Cox as Mary Louise
Louis Zito as Manager
Linda Larimer as Cashier
Barry Gremillion as Diddle Brown
David Roberts as Gear Grinder
Phil Ferrell as Gear Grinder
Joe Flower as Gear Grinder
Carla Palmer as Glowie's Friend
Carrie Jessup as Glowie's Friend
Gloria Shaw as Mrs. Demars
Bill McGhee as Dr. Demars
Jessie Lee Fulton as Mom
Robert Valgova as Boss
Michelle Franks as Omalee Ledbetter
Jack Isbell as Divinity Student
Dejah Moore as Waitress
Curtis Posey as Deputy
Billy Vance White as Deputy
Hank Stohl as Sherman Vance

Reception
Lawrence Van Gelder of The New York Times wrote, "'Drive-In' possesses the virtue of fresh faces, the drawback of uneven acting, the irritation of occasional overwriting and the limited appeal of what is basically a juvenile story." Arthur D. Murphy of Variety called the film an "easy-going and likeable George Litto production. Rod Amateau's direction of Bob Peete's script turns the liabilities of low-budget production and largely unknown performers into creative assets by virtue of the simplicity and sincerity of the results." Gene Siskel of the Chicago Tribune gave the film two stars out of four, describing the humor as insult comedy typical of TV shows like Hee Haw and expressing his wish that "the script of 'Drive-In' had been trashed and 'Disaster '76' had been fully made instead."<ref>Siskel, Gene (June 3, 1976). "'Disaster' one-ups 'Drive-In'". Chicago Tribune. Section 3, p. 5.</ref> Kevin Thomas of the Los Angeles Times'' called it "a shrewdly made exploitation picture, undoubtedly indebted to 'American Graffiti' but played very, very broadly to reach the most unsophisticated of audiences. Yet as corny as it so often gets, it's consistently funny."

References

External links
 

1976 films
American comedy films
Columbia Pictures films
Films directed by Rod Amateau
Films set in a movie theatre
Films set in Texas
Films shot in Texas
Country music films
1976 comedy films
1970s English-language films
1970s American films